The Sound Barrier  is a 1952 British aviation drama film directed by David Lean. It is a fictional story about attempts by aircraft designers and test pilots to break the sound barrier. It was David Lean's third and final film with his wife Ann Todd, but it was his first for Alexander Korda's London Films, following the break-up of Cineguild. The Sound Barrier stars Ralph Richardson, Ann Todd, John Justin and Nigel Patrick. It was known in the United States as Breaking Through the Sound Barrier and Breaking the Sound Barrier.

The Sound Barrier was a box-office success on first release, but it has become one of the least-known of Lean's films. Following on In Which We Serve (1942), the film is another of Lean's ventures into a genre of filmmaking where impressions of documentary film are created.

Plot
After his aircraft company's groundbreaking work on jet engine technology in the Second World War, John Ridgefield, its wealthy owner, employs test pilot Tony Garthwaite, a successful wartime fighter pilot, to fly new jet-powered aircraft. Garthwaite is hired by Ridgefield after marrying Ridgefield's daughter, Susan. Tensions between father and daughter are accentuated by Garthwaite's dangerous job of test flying. In a noteworthy illustration of the new technology, Susan accompanies Garthwaite on a ferrying assignment of a two-seater de Havilland Vampire to Cairo, Egypt, returning later the same day as passengers on a de Havilland Comet.

Ridgefield's plan for his new jet fighter, "Prometheus", has placed the company in jeopardy. The problems faced by the new jet aircraft in exceeding the speed of sound, the so-called "sound barrier", are ever present. In an attempt to break the sound barrier, Garthwaite crashes and is killed.

Shocked at both the death of her husband and at her father's apparently single-minded and heartless approach to the dangers his test pilots face, Susan walks out on her father and goes to live with friends Jess and Philip Peel, another company test pilot. Ridgefield later engages Peel to take on the challenge of piloting "Prometheus" at speeds approaching the speed of sound. In a crucial flight and at the critical moment, Peel performs a counterintuitive action (foreshadowed in the opening scene of the film) which enables him to maintain control of the aircraft and to break the sound barrier. Eventually accepting that her father did care about those who died in tests, Susan changes her plan of moving to London and takes her young son with her back to live with Sir John.

Cast

 Ralph Richardson as John Ridgefield
 Ann Todd as Susan Garthwaite
 Nigel Patrick as Tony Garthwaite
 John Justin as Philip Peel
 Dinah Sheridan as Jess Peel
 Joseph Tomelty as Will Sparks
 Denholm Elliott as Christopher Ridgefield
 Jack Allen as 'Windy' Williams
 Ralph Michael as Fletcher
 Rodney Goodall as Little Boy (uncredited)
 Donald Harron as ATA officer (uncredited)
 Vincent Holman as Factor (uncredited)
 Jolyon Jackley as Baby (uncredited)
 Douglas Muir as Controller (uncredited)
 Leslie Phillips as Controller (uncredited)
 Anthony Snell as Peter Makepeace (uncredited)
 Robert Brooks Turner as Test Bed Operator (uncredited)

Production
The strong relationship to aviation history in The Sound Barrier has led to its being characterised as a "semi-documentary". The film pays tribute to the British effort in the historic advance in aviation of the development and final perfecting of the jet engine by Frank Whittle and Power Jets Ltd and others following.

David Lean had begun to gather research based on media reports of jet aircraft approaching supersonic speeds, interviewing British aeronautic designers. He even managed to fly with test pilots as he produced a 300-page notebook that he turned over to dramatist Terence Rattigan. The subsequent screenplay concentrated on the newly discovered problems of flying at supersonic speeds and is also loosely based on the real-life story of aircraft designer Geoffrey de Havilland and the loss of his son. Geoffrey de Havilland, Jr. was the de Havilland company test pilot who died on 27 September 1946 attempting to fly faster than the speed of sound in the DH 108.

John Derry, another de Havilland test pilot, has been called "Britain's first supersonic pilot," because of a dive he made on 6 September 1948 in a DH 108.

Contrary to what is depicted in the film, the first aircraft to break the sound barrier was the rocket-powered Bell X-1 flown by Chuck Yeager of the United States Air Force in 1947. His feat was portrayed in the 1983 film The Right Stuff. As Yeager, who was present at the US premiere, described in his first biography, The Sound Barrier was entertaining, but not that realistic – and any pilot who attempted to break the sound barrier in the manner portrayed in the film (forcing the centre stick forward to pull out of a dive) would have been killed. Because the 1947 Bell X-1 flight had not been widely publicised, many who saw The Sound Barrier thought it was a true story, and that the first supersonic flight was made by a British pilot.

Studio filming was completed at Shepperton Studios, but the flying sequences were filmed at Chilbolton Aerodrome, Nether Wallop, Hampshire, under the direction of Anthony Squire. A Vickers Valetta and Avro Lancaster bomber served as camera platforms for the aerial sequences. With the assistance of the British Aircraft Constructors Association, aircraft featured in The Sound Barrier were loaned by Vickers, de Havilland and other British aerospace companies. In addition, footage of early 1950s British jet technology used in the film includes scenes of the de Havilland Comet, the world's first jet passenger airliner, the Supermarine Attacker and the de Havilland Vampire. A Supermarine 535 prototype for the later Swift (VV119) featured as the experimental Prometheus jet fighter. Not unlike its screen persona, the Swift was an aircraft design that underwent particularly difficult teething problems during development.

Malcolm Arnold (later knighted) composed the music score, for this, the first of his three films for David Lean. The others were Hobson's Choice (1954) and The Bridge on the River Kwai (1957).

Reception

Critical
The Sound Barrier, in its American title as Breaking the Sound Barrier, was reviewed by Bosley Crowther in The New York Times. According to Crowther, "this picture, which was directed and produced in England by David Lean from an uncommonly literate and sensitive original script by Terence Rattigan, is a wonderfully beautiful and thrilling comprehension of the power of jet airplanes and of the minds and emotions of the people who are involved with these miraculous machines. And it is played with consummate revelation of subtle and profound characters by a cast headed by Ralph Richardson, Nigel Patrick, and Ann Todd".

Film historian Stephen Pendo further described the "brilliant aerial photography. ... Along with the conventional shot of the aircraft there is some unusual creative camera work. To illustrate the passage of a plane, Lean shows only the wheat in a field being bent by air currents produced by the unseen jet. ... Even the cockpit shots are very good, with the test pilots in G-suits and goggles framed by the plexiglass and sky backgrounds."

Box office
The Sound Barrier was the 12th most popular movie at the British box office in 1952, and also did well in the United States, making a comfortable profit.

Awards

Academy Awards
 Winner: Best Sound Recording – London Films
 Nominee Best story written directly for the screen (Terence Rattigan)

With this film, Ralph Richardson became the first actor to win the New York Film Critics Award for Best Actor who did not receive an Oscar nomination.

BAFTA Awards
 Winner Best Film from any Source
 Winner Best British Film
 Winner Best British Actor (Ralph Richardson)
 Nominee Best British Actor (Nigel Patrick)
 Nominee Best British Actress (Ann Todd)

US National Board of Review
 Winner Best Actor (Ralph Richardson)
 Winner Best Director (David Lean)
 Winner Best Foreign Film 
 Listed in Top Foreign Films

New York Critics Circle
 Winner Best Actor (Ralph Richardson)

Notes

Citations

Bibliography

 Brown, Eric. The Miles M.52: Gateway to Supersonic Flight. Stroud, Gloucestershire, UK: The History Press, 2012. .
 Brown, Eric. Wings on my Sleeve.  London: Weidenfeld & Nicolson, 2006. .
 Carlson, Mark. Flying on Film: A Century of Aviation in the Movies, 1912–2012. Duncan, Oklahoma: BearManor Media, 2012. .
 Davies, R.E.G. and Philip J. Birtles. Comet: The World's First Jet Airliner. McLean, Virginia: Paladwr Press, 1999. .
 de Havilland, Geoffrey. Sky Fever: The Autobiography of Sir Geoffrey De Havilland. Ramsbury, Marlborough, Wiltshire, UK: Crowood Press Ltd., 1999. .
 Hamilton-Paterson, James. Empire of the Clouds: When Britain's Aircraft Ruled the World. London: Faber & Faber, 2010. .
 Hardwick, Jack and Ed Schnepf. "A Viewer's Guide to Aviation Movies." The Making of the Great Aviation Films. General Aviation Series, Volume 2, 1989.
 Kulik, Karol. Alexander Korda: The Man Who Could Work Miracles. London: Virgin, 1990. .
 Paris, Michael. From the Wright Brothers to Top gun: Aviation, Nationalism, and Popular Cinema. Manchester, UK: Manchester University Press, 1995. .
 Pendo, Stephen. Aviation in the Cinema. Lanham, Maryland: Scarecrow Press, 1985. .
 Porter, Vincent. "The Robert Clark Account." Historical Journal of Film, Radio and Television, Vol. 20 No. 4, 2000.
 Pratley, Gerald. The Cinema of David Lean. Aurora, Colorado: Oak Tree Publications, !974. .
 Winchester, Jim. The World's Worst Aircraft: From Pioneering Failures to Multimillion Dollar Disasters. London: Amber Books Ltd., 2005. .
 Wood, Derek. Project Cancelled. Indianapolis: The Bobbs-Merrill Company Inc., 1975. .
 Yeager, Chuck, Bob Cardenas, Bob Hoover, Jack Russell and James Young. The Quest for Mach One: A First-Person Account of Breaking the Sound Barrier. New York: Penguin Studio, 1997. .
 Yeager, Chuck and Leo Janos. Yeager: An Autobiography. New York: Bantam Books, 1986. .

External links
 
 
 

1952 films
British aviation films
British black-and-white films
British Lion Films films
Films about test pilots
Films directed by David Lean
Films shot at Shepperton Studios
Films that won the Best Sound Mixing Academy Award
Films with screenplays by Terence Rattigan
Best Film BAFTA Award winners
Best British Film BAFTA Award winners
Films scored by Malcolm Arnold
London Films films
1950s English-language films
1950s British films